Got the Magic may refer to:

 Got the Magic (Celtic Harp Orchestra album), 2003
 Got the Magic (Spyro Gyra album), 1999